Noertzange is a small town in the commune of Bettembourg, in southern Luxembourg. In 2005, the town had a population of 961.

Noertzange is the site of a railway junction, with Line 10 dividing between the main line, which leads to Niederkorn, and a branch line, which leads to Rumelange. Noertzange railway station is the last station within Luxembourg City's short-distance fare zone.

Bettembourg
Towns in Luxembourg